Arwā bint ʿAbd al-Muṭṭalib was an aunt of Muhammad.

Early life
She was born in Mecca around 560, the daughter of Abd al-Muttalib ibn Hashim and Fatima bint Amr, who was from the Makhzum clan of the Quraysh tribe.

Her first husband was Umayr ibn Wahb, by whom she had a son, Tulayb. Her second husband was Arta ibn Sharahbil ibn Hashim, by whom she had a daughter, Fatima.

Conversion to Islam
Her son Tulayb became a Muslim in the house of Al-Arqam. Arwa approved of his support for his cousin Muhammad, saying that if only she were a man, she would take up arms to protect her nephew. Tulayb then asked what prevented her from becoming a Muslim. Arwa made the declaration of faith and spoke out in support of Muhammad in Mecca.

Her brother Abu Lahab called on her, saying he was astonished that she had abandoned their father's religion. Arwa replied that she was a Muslim and that she advised Abu Lahab to support their nephew, for even if Muhammad's mission failed, Abu Lahab would have the excuse that he was only protecting a family member.

Arwa joined the general emigration to Medina in 622.

Elegy for Muhammad
She outlived Muhammad, an elegy for whom is attributed to her.
O Allah's Messenger! Thou wert our hope
and thou wert kind to us and not cruel.
Thou wert kind, merciful and our Prophet.
Whoever weepeth should weep for thee today ...
For Allah's Messenger may my mother and maternal aunt be sacrificed,
my paternal uncle, my maternal uncle and even mine own soul ...
May Allah's peace be in greeting to thee,
and may thou enter the Garden of Aden with joy.

References

Family of Muhammad
Banu Hashim
6th-century Arabs